Stenotsivoka negrei is a species of beetle in the family Cerambycidae. It was described by Vives in 2004.

References

Dorcasominae
Beetles described in 2004